Battle Cross may refer to:
Battle Cross (1982 video game), an arcade game
Battle Cross (1994 video game), a video game for the Super Famicom system
The Fallen Soldier Battle Cross, an award given for military service
Battlecross, an American heavy metal music group